Gabriel Zugrăvescu was a Romanian handball player and manager, and author of books on handball. He was nicknamed "Bebe". 

Led by Zugrăvescu, the Romania women's national handball team finished 4th in the 1971 World Championship.

Achievements

Player

Handball 11s  
Liga Națională: 
Bronze Medalist: 1950

Manager

Handball 11s  
Liga Națională: 
Winner: 1959, 1961
Silver Medalist: 1957, 1958, 1963

Handball 7s  
Liga Națională: 
Winner: 1960, 1961, 1962, 1963
Silver Medalist: 1964

European Champions Cup:
Winner: 1964

Personal life
His father was a priest.

References

 
   
Romanian male handball players
Romanian handball coaches  
Romanian men's basketball players 
Romanian sportswriters